In 1997, eleven European universities came together to establish the European Consortium of Innovative Universities (ECIU). The consortium is a group of universities dedicated to the development of an innovative culture in their institutions, and to a catalytic role for innovation in industry and society. All have academic strengths in engineering and social science; all are relatively young, entrepreneurial, and progressive; and all have close ties to industry and to the regions in which they are situated. They are committed to developing and implementing new forms of teaching, training, and research; to developing an innovative culture within their walls- to experimenting with new forms of management and administration; and to sustaining and nurturing internationally minded staff.

Mission 
The ECIU’s mission is:
 To contribute to the development of a knowledge-based European economy, with inclusion of ECIU overseas members (Associate Partners). 
 To build on existing innovation and to enhance quality in the member institutions, in the areas of: international collaboration; teaching and learning; regional development; technology transfer; and staff and student development. 
 To develop collaborative educational programmes, by building on research and teaching strengths within the member institutions.
 To act as an ‘agent of change’ by serving as an example of best practice and by influencing debate and policy on the future direction for European higher education.
(see ECIU Website)

Member universities 
 The ECIU has 14 members including one oversea associate partner:
University of Aalborg, Denmark
Dublin City University, Ireland
Technische Universität Hamburg, Germany
Kaunas University of Technology, Lithuania
Linköping University, Sweden
Tampere University, Finland
Autonomous University of Barcelona, Spain
Aveiro University, Portugal
University of Stavanger, Norway
University of Trento, Italy
University of Twente, The Netherlands
Groupe INSA, France
Łódź University of Technology, Poland

Associate partner universities
Monterrey Institute of Technology and Higher Education, Mexico

Organisation and activities 
The ECIU Executive Board, consisting of the rector or vice rector and a local coordinator of each member institution, meets twice a year. The local coordinator is the contact person for information on activities, projects and seminars, and he informs the partner university about ECIU activities.

The activities of the consortium are organised within four core areas:
 Improved student mobility and the ECIU Graduate School
 Human resources development
 Knowledge triangle
 EU Policy

In addition to the Steering Committees, there are working groups for staff members of the member institutions.

External links
Official website

College and university associations and consortia in Europe
Innovation organizations
Technology consortia